Park Forest may refer to:
Park Forest, Illinois
Park Forest (meteorite)
Park Forest Village, Pennsylvania
Park Forest, Dallas, Texas
Park Forest Plaza

See also
Forest Park (disambiguation)